271 (two hundred [and] seventy-one) is the natural number after  and before .

Properties
271 is a twin prime with 269, a cuban prime (a prime number that is the difference of two consecutive cubes), and a centered hexagonal number. It is the smallest prime number bracketed on both sides by numbers divisible by cubes, and the smallest prime number bracketed by numbers with five primes (counting repetitions) in their factorizations:
After 7, 271 is the second-smallest Eisenstein–Mersenne prime, one of the analogues of the Mersenne primes in the Eisenstein integers.

271 is the largest prime factor of the five-digit repunit 11111, and the largest prime number for which the decimal period of its multiplicative inverse is 5:

It is a sexy prime with 277.

References

Integers